Darai may refer to:
 Darai language, a language of Nepal
 Darai people, an ethnic group of Nepal
 Al Darai, a tribe of the United Arab Emirates
 Darai, Iran, a village in Iran
 Lipika Singh Darai, Indian filmmaker

See also 
 Darae (disambiguation)
 Daray
 Derai, a town in Bangladesh